Bilawali Lake is located on Indore-Khandwa Road (Indore-Icchapur State Highway) in Indore. The total area of the lake and its surrounding protected region is 400 hectares (around 4 square kilometers) and falls under the jurisdiction of the Indore Municipal Corporation.

History
Bilawali Lake was created by the Holkars of Indore State in the early 20th century. It completed 100 years of existence in 2016. After the independence of India and extinction of the royal houses, religious sites started mushrooming up around the lake and over the years it was encroached upon by the people living in its vicinity. Illegal activities like fishing, poaching, cattle grazing, waste dumping, etc., almost destroyed the lake's ecology.

Tourism
The lake is flocked by tourists who wish to spend quality time among the soothing waves. The development of a canoeing & kayaking stadium is also underway, and there are further plans to develop it as a water-sports & tourism destination.

Fishing
Fishing activities also take place in the lake. A set of fish are harvested by the Fisheries Department.

See also
 Sirpur Lake
 Indore
 Yashwant Sagar

References

Indore